Route 4 was a route that went from U.S. Route 136 (US 136) at the Nebraska state line to US 169 at the Iowa state line.

Major intersections

References

004